is a Japanese actor, comedian, television personality and voice actor. He is a member of the theatrical and musical unit TEAM NACS, and is represented by Creative Office Cue. His wife Kumiko Nakajima is a drama producer at Fuji TV.

In 1995, while still in university, Oizumi debuted as an entertainer on the late-night program Mosaic nights aired in Hokkaidō. He first gained popularity on the television series How Do You Like Wednesday?, and has since expanded to various fields of entertainment, such as television dramas, films, voice acting and music.

Biography

Early life and career beginnings 
Oizumi was born at the Ebetsu City Hospital in Ebetsu, Hokkaidō. He has been living in Sapporo since 1984. After graduating Sapporo Moiwa High School, he failed his entrance exams and did nothing but "play around".

After failing his entrance exams two years in a row, in 1994, he entered the Hokkai Gakuen University to study business. Oizumi did not wish to enter the university, and was so depressed that his mother worried that "he might die". However, realizing that he cannot just let himself rot away, he entered the university's theater club. In 1996, he organized the theatrical company TEAM NACS with his friends, Hiroyuki Morisaki, Ken Yasuda, Shigeyuki Totsugi, Takuma Oto'o. The company disbanded after Morisaki and Yasuda graduated, but reunited after the two quit their jobs to join again.

In 1995, through the recommendation of Totsugi and Morisaki, Oizumi joined the Inada Troupe organized by Hiroshi Inada, and was a member until 2004. According to Oizumi, Inada taught him "how to stand on the stage".

Career 
In October 1995, when Oizumi was still in university, he debuted as an entertainer through his portrayal of 2nd generation Genki-kun on the late-night program Mosaic nights aired on HTB. He was chosen after the program staff were searching for Mamoru Tanaka, the original Genki-kun, and Oizumi was introduced to the director by Ito Ayumi, the wife of Takayuki Suzui. Oizumi joined the entertainment agency Creative Office Cue directly after this.

Oizumi first made a name for himself in a Hokkaidō-based TV variety series How do you like Wednesday? and has been actively appearing on various media programs in Hokkaidō since then. TEAM-NACS had run their first national tour with their 11th original play COMPOSER during spring and summer 2005. After this, they held their 12th tour HONOR in Tokyo, Osaka and Sapporo, through March to May 2007. In 2007, he provided the voice of Professor Hershel Layton in the puzzle video game Professor Layton and the Curious Village as well as its sequels and movie.

Along with the increasing popularity of How do you like Wednesday? and TEAM-NACS not only within Hokkaidō but throughout Japan, he expanded his works in various fields by appearing on nationwide TV dramas and films, portraying character voices on animated films and releasing CDs as a singer. In addition to voice acting, he has also been active as a writer and painter.

He calls his fans "Koneko chan tachi", which means "kittens" in Japanese, although he does not like cats.

Private life 
On May 30, 2011, he became the father of a baby girl. On his website he joked saying, "Today I successfully became a father!"

Filmography

Film

TV dramas

Japanese dub

Variety shows
 How do you like Wednesday? (水曜どうでしょう,1996~2002, Hokkaidō Television Broadcasting)
 Onigiri Atatamemasuka (おにぎりあたためますか,2003~,Hokkaidō Television Broadcasting)
 Hanatare NACS (ハナタレナックス,2003~,Hokkaidō Television Broadcasting)
 Ippachi ikouyo (1×8いこうよ,2000~, Sapporo Television Broadcasting)
 Songs (2017~, NHK)

Video games
 Professor Layton and the Curious Village (2007) – Professor Layton
 Professor Layton and the Diabolical Box (2007) – Professor Layton
 Professor Layton and the Unwound Future (2008) – Professor Layton
 Professor Layton and the Last Specter (2009) – Professor Layton
 Ni No Kuni (2010) – Swaine
 Professor Layton and the Miracle Mask (2011) – Professor Layton
 Professor Layton vs. Phoenix Wright: Ace Attorney (2012) – Professor Layton
 Professor Layton and the Azran Legacy (2013) – Professor Layton
 Professor Layton and the New World of Steam (2023) – Professor Layton

Others
66th NHK Kōhaku Uta Gassen (2015, NHK), judge
71st NHK Kōhaku Uta Gassen (2020, NHK), the white team captain
The Masked Singer Japan (2021, Amazon Prime Video), MC
72nd NHK Kōhaku Uta Gassen (2021, NHK), host
73rd NHK Kōhaku Uta Gassen (2022, NHK), host

Discography
 Today's Soup（本日のスープ, Duet song with STARDUST REVUE in 2004）
 Not get up guy（起きないあいつ, Duet song with Shigeyuki Totsugi in 2004）

Awards

References

External links
 Official profile 
 TEAM-NACS Official profile on Amuse, Inc. 
 

1973 births
Living people
Japanese male film actors
Japanese male television actors
Male voice actors from Hokkaido
People from Ebetsu, Hokkaido
Amuse Inc. talents
21st-century Japanese singers
21st-century Japanese male singers